Reflections of a Golden Dream is an album by keyboardist Lonnie Liston Smith, featuring performances recorded in 1976 and released by the Flying Dutchman label the following year.

Reception

In his review for AllMusic, Steven Thomas Erlewine stated, "he already struck upon a blend of the spiritual and funk with 1975's Expansions. Released a year later, Reflections of a Golden Dream tips the scales a bit closer to funk ... After this Reflections starts to seem as meditative as its title, achieving a kind of elegant spiritual suspension while also feeling as fleet and slick as satin ... and while the rest of the record contains many period accouterments -- sustained strings, electric pianos, deep echoes -- the essence of the record is indeed meditative. Perhaps these are polyester paisley dreams but that doesn't make them any less real or affecting".

Track listing
All compositions by Lonnie Liston Smith
 "Get Down Everybody (It's Time for World Peace)" − 4:23
 "Quiet Dawn" − 3:31
 "Sunbeams" − 3:53
 "Meditations" − 4:22
 "Peace & Love" − 2:39
 "Beautiful Woman" − 6:04
 "Goddess of Love" − 4:23
 "Inner Beauty" − 2:17
 "Golden Dreams" − 4:49
 "Journey into Space" − 2:30

Personnel
Lonnie Liston Smith − electric piano, classical piano, electronic colorations, vocals
Donald Smith − flute, vocals (tracks 2, 3 & 5-9)
Leopoldo Fleming − congas, percussion, vocals, piano
Joe Shepley, Jon Faddis − trumpet, flugelhorn  (tracks 1 & 5)
David Hubbard − soprano saxophone, tenor saxophone, flute (tracks 1-3 & 5-9)
George Opalisky − tenor saxophone (tracks 1 & 5)
Arthur Kaplan − baritone saxophone (tracks 1 & 5)
Al Anderson − bass (tracks 1-3, 5-7 & 9)
Wilby Fletcher − drums  (tracks 1-3, 5-7 & 9)
Guilherme Franco − percussion (tracks 1-9)
Maeretha Stewart, Patti Austin, Vivian Cherry − chorus (tracks 1 & 5)
Horace Ott − percussion arrangement (track 5)
Cosmic Beings − other (track 10)

References

1976 albums
Albums produced by Bob Thiele
Flying Dutchman Records albums
RCA Records albums
Lonnie Liston Smith albums